Ivan Urvanțev(born 2 May 1997) is a Moldovan professional footballer, currently playing as a midfielder.

Honours 
FC Sheriff Tiraspol

 Divizia Națională: 2015–16, 2016–17
 Moldovan Cup: 2015–16
 Divizia "A": 2014–15
 Moldovan Super Cup: 2016

References

External links 
 
 Profile on fc-sheriff.com

1997 births
Living people
Moldovan footballers
Moldovan Super Liga players
Association football midfielders
FC Sheriff Tiraspol players
CS Petrocub Hîncești players
CSF Bălți players
FC Sfîntul Gheorghe players
FC Dinamo-Auto Tiraspol players
Liga II players
FC Ripensia Timișoara players
Moldovan expatriate footballers
Moldovan expatriate sportspeople in Romania
Expatriate footballers in Romania